Several new rockets and spaceports began operations in 2016.

Overview
Russia inaugurated the far-Eastern Vostochny Cosmodrome on 28 April 2016 with a traditional Soyuz-2.1a flight, before expanding it for the Angara rocket family in the following years.  The Chinese Long March 7 flew its maiden flight from the new Wenchang Satellite Launch Center on Hainan Island on 25 June, and the maiden flight of the Long March 5 took place on 3 November. Two years after its 2014 accident, the Antares rocket returned to flight on 17 October with its upgraded 230 version featuring the Russian RD-181 engine.

After many failed attempts, SpaceX began landing its Falcon 9 first stages on autonomous spaceport drone ships, edging closer to their long-stated goal of developing reusable launch vehicles. The company indicated that the recovered engines and structures did not suffer significant damage. One of the landed boosters, B1021, launched in April 2016, was flown again in March 2017; two others were converted to side boosters for the maiden flight of Falcon Heavy.

The ExoMars mission, a collaboration between the European and Russian space agencies, was launched on 14 March and reached Mars on 19 October.  Dedicated to astrobiology investigations, this flight carried the ExoMars Trace Gas Orbiter, which reached Mars orbit, and the Schiaparelli EDM lander, which crashed upon landing. A subsequent flight scheduled for 2020 will carry the ExoMars Rosalind Franklin rover along with four static surface instruments. 
Meanwhile, the Japanese space probe Akatsuki started its observations of Venus in May after spending five months gradually adjusting its orbit. 
Planetary exploration activities took center stage with the orbit insertion of NASA's Juno probe at Jupiter on 4 July, followed by the launch of NASA's OSIRIS-REx mission to asteroid 101955 Bennu on 8 September. Finally, on 30 September, the Rosetta probe executed a slow crash-landing on comet 67P/Churyumov–Gerasimenko.

Human spaceflights included the return of Scott Kelly and Mikhail Kornienko in March after a yearlong mission on the ISS, the longest-ever continuous stay by astronauts at the station. Kelly also set the record for the longest-duration stay of an American in orbit. Four ISS Expeditions numbered 47 to 50 were launched in 2016, the first one using the last Soyuz TMA-M spacecraft and the next three inaugurating the modernized Soyuz MS. Expedition 50 will continue into 2017. Several EVAs were performed to maintain the exterior of the ISS. The experimental BEAM inflatable habitat was attached to the ISS on 16 April and expanded on 28 May to begin two years of on-orbit tests. Meanwhile, China launched its new Tiangong-2 space laboratory in September, which was first visited by two astronauts for a month between 19 October and 17 November.

Orbital launches 

|colspan=8 style="background:white;"|

January 
|-

|colspan=8 style="background:white;"|

February 
|-

|colspan=8 style="background:white;"|

March 
|-

|colspan=8 style="background:white;"|

April 
|-

|colspan=8 style="background:white;"|

May 
|-

|colspan=8 style="background:white;"|

June 
|-

|colspan=8 style="background:white;"|

July 
|-

|colspan=8 style="background:white;"|

August 
|-

|colspan=8 style="background:white;"|

September 
|-

|colspan=8 style="background:white;"|

October 
|-

|colspan=8 style="background:white;"|

November 
|-

|colspan=8 style="background:white;"|

December 
|-

|}

Suborbital flights 

|}

Deep space rendezvous

Extra-vehicular activities (EVAs)

Space debris events

Orbital launch statistics

By country 
For the purposes of this section, the yearly tally of orbital launches by country assigns each flight to the country of origin of the rocket, not to the launch services provider or the spaceport. For example, Soyuz launches by Arianespace in Kourou are counted under Russia because Soyuz-2 is a Russian rocket.

By rocket

By family

By type

By configuration

By spaceport

By orbit

References 

Notes

Citations

 
2016-related lists
Spaceflight by year